Stephen Edgar (born 1951) is an Australian poet, editor and indexer.

Background and education

Edgar was born in Sydney, where he attended Sydney Technical High School. After time spent living in London, he later returned to Australia, going on to study classics and librarianship at the University of Tasmania.

Poetry

His first published poetry appeared in 1979 in the Tasmanian literary quarterly Island (originally The Tasmanian Review). From 1986 to the present he has been subeditor of Island and was poetry editor between 1989 and 1994. He is the author of seven books of poetry.

As well as extensive publication of his verse in print media, Stephen Edgar has published poetry in online poetry magazines such as Snorkel, The Poetry Foundation, The Chimaera, and The Flea.

As poet Kevin Hart observed, Edgar "is distinctive for a firm commitment to closed forms and for showing considerable panache in handling them".

Other critical material on Stephen Edgar includes a close reading by Clive James of Edgar's "Man on the Moon" in the Poetry Foundation'''s online magazine.

Edgar's Eldershaw (2013) was shortlisted for the Queensland Literary Awards (2013) and the Prime Minister's Literary Awards (2014).

Awards

1984 — Harri Jones Memorial Prize for Poetry
2003 — Grace Leven Prize for Poetry and William Baylebridge Memorial Prize (for Lost in the Foreground)
2005 — Australian Book Review Poetry Prize (for his poem "Man on the Moon")
2006 — Philip Hodgins Memorial Medal for an outstanding contribution to Australian literature, at the Mildura Writers’ Festival.
2009 — William Baylebridge Memorial Prize (for History of the Day)
2011 — Dorothy Porter Poetry Prize (co-winner, for the poem 'All Eyes')
2013 — Australian Catholic University Literature Award (for the poem ‘The Dancer')
2014 — Colin Roderick Award (co-winner, for Eldershaw)
2021 — Prime Minister's Literary Award for Poetry, The Strangest Place: New and selected poemsBibliography

 Queuing for the Mudd Club (Hobart, Twelvetrees Publishing Company, 1985)
 Ancient Music (Sydney, Angus and Robertson, 1988)
 Corrupted Treasures (Melbourne, William Heinemann Australia, 1995)
 Where the Trees Were (Canberra, Indigo/Ginninderra Press, 1999)
 Lost in the Foreground (Sydney, Duffy and Snellgrove, 2003, ; reprinted Warners Bay, Picaro Press, 2008)
 Other Summers (Melbourne, Black Pepper publishing, 2006)
 Photography for Beginners (Compact Disc, Spit Junction, River Road Press, 2007)
 History of the Day (Melbourne, Black Pepper publishing, 2009)
 The Red Sea: New & Selected Poems (Fort Worth, Baskerville Publishers, 2012)
 Eldershaw (Melbourne, Black Pepper publishing, 2013)
 Exhibits of the Sun (Melbourne, Black Pepper publishing, 2014)The Strangest Place: New and selected poems'' (Melbourne, Black Pepper publishing, 2020)

See also
For further information on Australian poets see List of Australian poets

References

External links

 Stephen Edgar's website
 Poems and introductory article at the Clive James website
 Reviews and articles at Black Pepper Publishing website
 Poems and comments at The Write Stuff

1951 births
20th-century Australian poets
Living people
21st-century Australian poets
Australian male poets
20th-century Australian male writers
21st-century Australian male writers